Mathematical philosophy may refer to: 
 Introduction to Mathematical Philosophy (1919), by Bertrand Russell

See also 
 Principia Mathematica (1910–13), by Russell and Whitehead